The 1952–54 FDGB-Pokal was the third competition for the national cup title in association football in East Germany.

The competition had started with 84 teams from the third-tier Bezirksliga and fourth-tier Bezirksklasse competitions of the 15 Bezirke. After two qualifying rounds the First Round was played with 64 teams on 7 June 1953. These 64 teams were the 21 remaining teams from the qualifying rounds, 26 teams from the second-tier DDR-Liga and 17 teams from the 1952–53 DDR-Oberliga. The matches for the second round were drawn, but not played due to the events around the uprising of 1953 in East Germany, even though officially the summer holidays were given as the reason for an indefinite postponement. In the spring of 1954, the Second Round teams were drawn again, and the competition resumed with the matches on 25 April 1954.

By the Third Round, 13 of the Oberliga teams had been eliminated, but two Bezirksliga sides were still in the competition: BSG Chemie Apolda and Aktivist Welzow. While they were eliminated in this round, three second-tier teams reached the quarterfinals: Empor Wurzen-West, BSG Chemie Zeitz and Vorwärts Berlin. Vorwärts, who just had secured promotion to the Oberliga, and Oberliga side Motor Zwickau eventually reached the final.

First qualifying round 

 Forfeit, Jena withdrew

Replay

Second qualifying round 

  Forfeit, Torgelow withdrew.

First round 

(played on 7 June 1953)

 Originally 4-0, but as Weißenfels had fielded an ineligible player the result was annulled.
 Thale filed a protest, because two of their players were away on national team duty. The match was replayed and ended in a 1-3 defeat for Thale again.

Replays 
(played on 10 June 1953)

 Forfeit, Lauscha withdrew.

Second round 
All matches of the second round were postponed, officially due to the summer holidays. The actual reason were the events surrounding the uprising of 1953 in East Germany. The Second Round was redrawn and played in 1954.

Original draw

New matches 
(played on 25 April 1954)

Third round
(played on 16/19 May 1954)

Quarterfinals
(played on 23 May 1954)

Semifinals
(played on 2 June 1954)

Final

References

FDGB-Pokal seasons
East
East
1952–53 in East German football
1953–54 in East German football